Luis Ernesto Castro Sánchez (31 July 1921 – 17 December 2002), nicknamed Mandrake, was a Uruguayan football forward who played for Uruguay in the 1954 FIFA World Cup. He also played for Club Nacional de Football.

References

External links
 FIFA profile

1921 births
2002 deaths
Uruguayan footballers
Uruguay international footballers
Association football forwards
1954 FIFA World Cup players
Uruguayan Primera División players
Club Nacional de Football players
Copa América-winning players